Ohongkar is a 2017 Bangladeshi drama film directed by Shahadat Hossain Liton. It is produced by Tushar Kothachitro. The film stars Shakib Khan and Shabnom Bubly as lead role. It also supporting role with Toma Mirza, Mizu Ahmed, Rehana Jolly, Afzal Sharif, and Nuton. The film release on 2 September 2017 for the Eid-ul-Adha. The movie is a remake of 2005 Kannada film Auto Shankar.

Cast
 Shakib Khan as Mahim
 Shabnom Bubly as Maya
 Toma Mirza as Taniya
 Mizu Ahmed
 Rehana Jolly as Mahim's mother
 Sadek Bachchu as Mahim's father
 Afzal Sharif
 Nuton as Ammajaan
 Sadiq Siddiqui
 Md Jakir Hossain as Jakir

Soundtrack
The film music album composed by Shawkat Ali Emon, Ahmed Imtiaz Bulbul and Ali Akram Shuvo. The background score produced by Emon Shaha. Also lyrics by Ahmed Imtiaz Bulbul, Kabir Bakul and Sudip Kumar Dip. Live Technologies Ltd named the music rights of the film.

Track listing

References

External links 
 

2017 films
2017 drama films
Bangladeshi drama films
Films shot in Dhaka
Bengali-language Bangladeshi films
Films scored by Shawkat Ali Emon
Films scored by Ali Akram Shuvo
Films scored by Ahmed Imtiaz Bulbul
2010s Bengali-language films
Bangladeshi remakes of Indian films